Everything You Need is the third album by American band Slightly Stoopid. It was released by Surfdog Records on March 18, 2003.

Track listing

Charts

References

Slightly Stoopid albums
2003 albums
Surfdog Records albums